"Set Me Free" is a song recorded by American singer Mary J. Blige. It was written by Blige, Jazmine Sullivan, Darhyl "DJ" Camper, Jr., and Charles Hinshaw for her thirteenth studio album, Strength of a Woman (2017), while production was helmed by Camper. The song was released as the album's fourth single on July 19, 2017, and peaked at number eight on the US Adult R&B Songs.

Critical reception 
The reception to the song has been generally positive, with Entertainment Weekly calling it a "fiery kissoff." The Guardian called the song "pleasingly understated" with "D'Angelo vibes," while The New York Times wrote that Blige sounds "ecstatic and free."

Commercial reception 
"Set Me Free" became Blige's 22nd top-ten hit on the Billboard Adult R&B Songs chart, tying the record for most top-10 hits on that chart. It also became her third top-ten hit on that chart from the Strength of a Woman album.

Charts

Weekly charts

Year-end charts

Release history

References

External links 
 MaryJBlige.com — official website

2017 singles
2017 songs
Mary J. Blige songs
Capitol Records singles
Songs written by Mary J. Blige
Songs written by Jazmine Sullivan
Songs written by Darhyl Camper